Otar Iosseliani (born 2 February 1934) is a Georgian-born film director. He was born in the Georgian capital city of Tbilisi, where he studied at the Tbilisi State Conservatoire and graduated in 1952 with a diploma in composition, conducting and piano.

Biography
In 1953 he went to Moscow to study at the faculty of mathematics, but in two years he quit and entered the State Film Institute (VGIK) where his teachers were Alexander Dovzhenko and Mikhail Chiaureli. While still a student, he began working at the Gruziafilm studios in Tbilisi, first as an assistant director and then as an editor of documentaries.

In 1958 he directed his first short film Akvarel. In 1961 he graduated from VGIK with a diploma in film direction. When his medium-length film Aprili (1961) was denied theatrical distribution, Iosseliani abandoned filmmaking and in 1963–1965 worked first as a sailor on a fishing boat and then at the Rustavi metallurgical factory. Aprili was finally released only in 1972.

In 1966 he directed his first feature film Giorgobistve that was presented at the Critics' Week at the 1968 Cannes Film Festival and won a FIPRESCI award there. When his 1976 film Pastorali was shelved for a few years and then granted only a limited distribution, Iosseliani grew sceptical about getting any artistic freedom in his homeland. Following Pastorali's success at the 1982 Berlin Film Festival, the director moved to France where in 1984 he made Les Favoris de la Lune. The film was distinguished with a Special Jury Prize at the Venice Film Festival. Since then Venice became a showcase for all his subsequent films.

In 1986 he was a member of the jury at the 36th Berlin International Film Festival.

In 1989 he again received a Special Jury Prize for Et la Lumiere Fut and in 1992 the Pasinetti Award for Best Direction for La Chasse aux Papillons. After the dissolution of the Soviet Union he continued to work in France where he made the documentary Seule Georgie (1994) which was followed by the sardonic and allegorical Brigands - Chapitre VII (1996).

In 1995 he was a member of the jury at the 19th Moscow International Film Festival.

In 2011 his film Chantrapas was selected as the Georgian entry for the Best Foreign Language Film at the 84th Academy Awards, but it did not make the final shortlist.

In 2011 Otar Iosseliani received a lifetime achievement honor – the CineMerit Award at the Munich International Film Festival. It was given by his former pupil, a Georgian filmmaker Dito Tsintsadze.

Filmography 

 Akvarel (1958) (TV)
 Sapovnela (1959)
 April (1961) / Ap'rili
 Tudzhi (1964)
 Falling Leaves (1966) / Giorgobistve
 Georgian Ancient Songs (1969) / Dzveli qartuli simgera
 Once Upon a Time There Was a Singing Blackbird (1970) Iqo shashvi mgalobeli
 Pastorale (1975) / Past'orali
 Lettre d'un cinéaste (1982) (TV)
 Sept pièces pour cinéma noir et blanc (1983)
 Euzkadi été 1982 (1983) (TV)
 Favorites of the Moon (1984) / Les Favoris de la lune
 Un petit monastère en Toscane (1988)
 And Then There Was Light (1989) / Et la lumière fut
 Chasing Butterflies, aka Hunting Butterflies, aka The Butterfly Hunt (1992) / La Chasse aux papillons
 Seule, Georgie (1994)
 Brigands-Chapter VII (1996) / Brigands, chapitre VII
 Farewell, Home Sweet Home (1999) / Adieu, plancher des vaches!
 Monday Morning (2002) / Lundi matin
 Gardens in Autumn (2006) / Jardins en automne
 Chantrapas (2010)
 Winter Song (2015) / Chant d'hiver

References

External links 
 

1934 births
Living people
European Film Awards winners (people)
Film people from Tbilisi
Svan people
Film directors from Georgia (country)
French film directors
Soviet film directors
Gerasimov Institute of Cinematography alumni
Academic staff of High Courses for Scriptwriters and Film Directors
Soviet emigrants to France
Silver Bear for Best Director recipients
Kristián Award winners